Gaston Morlet (30 September 1907 - 16 Décember 1994) was a French racing cyclist. He rode in the 1925 Tour de France.

References

1907 births
1994 deaths
French male cyclists